The Matteucci Medal is an Italian award for physicists, named after Carlo Matteucci from Forlì. It was established to award physicists for their fundamental contributions. Under an Italian Royal Decree dated July 10, 1870, the Italian Society of Sciences was authorized to receive a donation from Carlo Matteucci for the establishment of the Prize.

Recipients
Matteucci Medalists

 1868 Hermann Helmholtz  
 1875 Henri Victor Regnault  
 1876 William Thomson, 1st Baron Kelvin  
 1877 Gustav Kirchhoff  
 1878 Gustav Wiedemann  
 1879 Wilhelm Eduard Weber 
 1880 Antonio Pacinotti  
 1881 Emilio Villari  
 1882 Augusto Righi  
 1887 Thomas Edison  
 1888 Heinrich Rudolph Hertz 
 1894 John Strutt, 3rd Baron Rayleigh  
 1895 Henry Augustus Rowland  
 1896 Wilhelm Conrad Röntgen and Philipp Lenard 
 1901 Guglielmo Marconi  
 1903 Albert Abraham Michelson  
 1904 Marie Curie and Pierre Curie  
 1905 Henri Poincaré  
 1906 James Dewar 
 1907 William Ramsay 
 1908 Antonio Garbasso 
 1909 Orso Mario Corbino 
 1910 Heike Kamerlingh Onnes 
 1911 Jean Perrin  
 1912 Pieter Zeeman 
 1913 Ernest Rutherford 
 1914 Max von Laue 
 1915 Johannes Stark 
 1915 William Henry Bragg and William Lawrence Bragg 
 1917 Antonino Lo Surdo 
 1918 Robert W. Wood 
 1919 Henry Gwyn-Jeffreys Moseley  
 1921 Albert Einstein 
 1923 Niels Bohr 
 1924 Arnold Sommerfeld 
 1925 Robert Andrews Millikan  
 1926 Enrico Fermi 
 1927 Erwin Schrödinger 
 1928 Chandrasekhara Venkata Raman 
 1929 Werner Heisenberg 
 1930 Arthur Compton  
 1931 Franco Rasetti 
 1932 Frédéric Joliot and Irène Joliot-Curie  
 1956 Wolfgang Pauli 
 1975 Bruno Touschek 
 1978 Abdus Salam 
 1979 Luciano Maiani 
 1980 Giancarlo Wick 
 1982 Rudolf Peierls 
 1985 Hendrik Casimir 
 1987 Pierre-Gilles De Gennes  
 1988 Lev B. Okun  
 1989 Freeman Dyson  
 1990 Jack Steinberger 
 1991 Bruno Rossi 
 1992 Anatole Abragam  
 1993 John Archibald Wheeler  
 1994 Claude Cohen-Tannoudji  
 1995 Tsung Dao Lee  
 1996 Wolfgang K.H. Panofsky  
 1998 Oreste Piccioni 
 2001 Theodor W. Hänsch 
 2002 Nicola Cabibbo 
 2003 Manuel Cardona 
 2004 David Ruelle
 2005 John Iliopoulos 
 2006  
 2016 Adalberto Giazotto 
 2017  
 2018 Gianluigi Fogli 
 2019 Federico Capasso 	
 2020 Massimo Inguscio 

 2021 Amos Maritan

See also

 List of physics awards

External links
 Matteucci Medal at the Italian National Academy of Sciences

References 

 
Physics awards
Awards established in 1868
Italian awards
1868 establishments in Italy